Amaniganj is a town in Milkipur tehsil, Faizabad district (officially Ayodhya district) in the Indian state of Uttar Pradesh. Amaniganj is situated on Milkipur-Rudauli road and is  51 km away from district headquarters Ayodhya city. Amaniganj is a block in Ayodhya, Uttar Pradesh.

There is a big market, shopping centres, food shops, TVS automobile agency, big vegetable market, hospital, many bank branches like State Bank of India, schools and colleges in Amaniganj, Ayodhya.  Pin code of Amaniganj is 224121.

Transport

By Road
Amaniganj has good connectivity by road with Faizabad, Ayodhya, Barabanki, Lucknow,
Sultanpur, Amethi, Raebareli, Akbarpur, Basti, Pratapgarh and Allahabad (Prayagraj). The state government's Road Transport Service runs regular buses to these cities. And Nearby towns Rudauli, Milkipur, Bhelsar, Harringtonganj, Kumarganj, Shahganj, Khandasa, Kochha, Khajurahat, Motiganj, Inayat Nagar, Haliyapur, Bikapur, Bhadarsa, Masodha, Chaure Bazar, Haiderganj, Tarun, Sohawal and Raunahi are also well connected with Amaniganj, Ayodhya.

By Train
Rudauli is the nearest railway station to Amaniganj, Ayodhya. Faizabad Junction (Ayodhya Cantt), Ayodhya Junction, Goshainganj, Nihalgarh, Barabanki Junction, Musafirkhana, Sultanpur Junction and Amethi are the nearby railway stations from Amaniganj, Ayodhya.

By Air
Ayodhya Airport (Ayodhya), Chaudhary Charan Singh Airport (Lucknow) and Allahabad Airport (Prayagraj) are the nearby airports to reach Amaniganj, Ayodhya.

References

 Cities and towns in Faizabad district